Tongatapu 2 is an electoral constituency for the Legislative Assembly in the Kingdom of Tonga. It was established for the November 2010 general election, when the multi-seat regional constituencies for People's Representatives were replaced by single-seat constituencies, electing one representative via the first past the post electoral system. Located on the country's main island, Tongatapu, it encompasses part of Kolofoʻou (a district of the capital city, Nukuʻalofa), and the villages of Fanga-ʻo-Pilolevu, Mailetaha, Haveluloto, Tofoa, and Koloua.

Its first representative was Semisi Sika, of the Democratic Party of the Friendly Islands. Sika, a first time MP, defeated Dr. Viliami Tangi, the incumbent Minister for Health, who had sat in Parliament as a minister but had not been an elected MP. Sika held the seat with a large majority in the 2014 general election. He lost it in the 2021 election to ʻUhilamoelangi Fasi.

Members of Parliament

Election results

2014

2010

References

Tongan legislative constituencies
Tongatapu
2010 establishments in Tonga
Constituencies established in 2010